Robert John Stanlake (17 March 1883 – 15 June 1972) was an Australian rules footballer who played with Geelong in the Victorian Football League (VFL).

Notes

External links 

1883 births
1972 deaths
Australian rules footballers from Ballarat
Geelong Football Club players
People educated at Geelong College